Frederick, Fred or Freddie Ross may refer to:

People 
 Frederick Augustus Ross (1796–1883), American Presbyterian clergyman
 Frederick Ross's Corner, a column attacking Ross in Brownlow's Whig
 Sir Frederick Leith-Ross (Frederick William Leith Ross, 1887–1968), chief economic adviser to the UK government, 1932–1945
 Fred Ross (community organizer) (1910–1992), American community organizer
 Fred Ross, American businessman and leader of the Art Renewal Center
 Fred Ross, father of American singer Diana Ross
 Fred Ross, Genesee County Sheriff's Deputy featured in the Michael Moore documentary Roger & Me
 Freddie Ross, American musician who performs under the stage name Big Freedia
 Fred Ross (American football), wide receiver for the Mississippi State Bulldogs

Fiction 
 Frederick Ross, a character on the American sitcom Woops!, played by Cleavant Derricks